Surface-mount technology (SMT) component placement systems, commonly called pick-and-place machines or P&Ps, are robotic machines which are used to place surface-mount devices (SMDs) onto a printed circuit board (PCB). They are used for high speed, high precision placing of a broad range of electronic components, like capacitors, resistors, integrated circuits onto the PCBs which are in turn used in computers, consumer electronics as well as industrial, medical, automotive, military and telecommunications equipment. Similar equipment exists for through-hole components.
This type of equipment is sometimes also used to package microchips using the flip chip method.

History

1980s and 1990s 
During this time, a typical SMT assembly line employed two different types of pick-and-place (P&P) machines arranged in sequence.

The unpopulated board was fed into a rapid placement machine. These machines, sometimes called chip shooters, place mainly low-precision, simple package components such as resistors and capacitors. These high-speed P&P machines were built around a single turret design capable of mounting up to two dozen stations. As the turret spins, the stations passing the back of the machine pick up parts from tape feeders mounted on a moving carriage. As the station proceeds around the turret, it passes an optical station that calculates the angle at which the part was picked up, allowing the machine to compensate for drift. Then, as the station reaches the front of the turret, the board is moved into the proper position, the nozzle is spun to put the part in proper angular orientation, and the part is placed on the board. Typical chip shooters can, under optimal conditions, place up to 53,000 parts per hour, or almost 15 parts per second.

Because the PCB is moved rather than the turret, only lightweight parts that will not be shaken loose by the violent motion of the PCB can be placed this way.

From the high speed machine, the board transits to a precision placement machine. These pick-and-place machines often use high resolution verification cameras and fine adjustment systems via high precision linear encoders on each axis to place parts more accurately than the high-speed machines. Furthermore, the precision placement machines are capable of handling larger or more irregularly shaped parts such as large package integrated circuits or packaged inductor coils and trimpots. Unlike the rapid placers, precision placers generally do not use turret mounted nozzles and instead rely on a gantry-supported moving head. These precision placers rely upon placement heads with relatively few pickup nozzles. The head sometimes has a laser identifier that scans a reflective marker on the PC board to orient the head to the board. Parts are picked up from tape feeders or trays, scanned by a camera (on some machines), and then placed in the proper position on the board. Some machines also center the parts on the head with two arms that close to center the part; the head then rotates 90 degrees and the arms close again to center the part once more. The margin of error for some components is, in many cases, less than half a millimeter (less than 0.02 inches).

2000 to present 
Due to the huge cost of having two separate machines to place parts, the speed limitations of the chip shooters, and the inflexibility of the machines, the electronic component machine manufacturers abandoned the technique.  To overcome these limitations they moved to an all-in-one modular, multi-headed, and multi-gantry machines that could have heads quickly swapped on different modules depending on the product being built to machines with multiple mini turrets capable of placing the whole spectrum of components with theoretical speeds of 136,000 components an hour. The fastest machines can have speeds of up to 200,000 CPH (components per hour).

2010 onwards 

Swapping heads onboard  placement machines required more inventory of heads and related spare parts for different heads to minimize the downtime. Placement machines have an all-in-one head that can place components ranging from 0.4 mm × 0.2 mm to 50 mm × 40 mm.
In addition to this there was a new concept wherein the user could borrow performance during peak periods.
There is a big change in the industry approach these days with more focus on software applications for the process. With new applications like POP and wafer placement on substrate the industry is moving beyond conventional component placement.
There is a big difference in the needs of SMT users. For many, the high speed machines are not suitable due to cost and speed. With recent changes in the economic climate the requirement for SMT placement becomes focused on the machine's versatility to deal with short runs and fast changeover. This means that lower cost machines with vision systems provide an affordable option for SMT users.  There are more users of low end and mid-range machines than the ultra fast placement systems.

SMT pick and place machine manufacturers include:
 Juki
 Fuji
 Panasonic
 Yamaha (bought I-Pulse, however they were marketed to the US and Europe as Assembleon. Yamaha was marketed to primarily Asia, until the acquisition of Assembleon by K&S.)
 Hanwha Precision Machinery (formerly Hanwha Techwin after the acquisition of Samsung Techwin by Hanwha Holdings.)
 Kulicke & Soffa (K&S) (former Philips and later Assembleon)
 Sony (Now Juki)
 ASM Assembly Systems (former SIEMENS / SIPLACE and DEK)
 Universal Instruments
 Mycronic
 Europlacer
 Essemtec
 Nordson (Bought Dima)
 Hitachi (Former Sanyo, SMT division sold to Yamaha)
 DDM Novastar
 Opulo

Operation
The placement equipment is part of a larger overall machine that carries out specific programmed steps to create a PCB assembly. Several sub-systems work together to pick up and correctly place the components onto the PCB. These systems normally use pneumatic suction cups, attached to a plotter-like device to allow the cup to be accurately manipulated in three dimensions.  Additionally, each nozzle can be rotated independently.

Component feeds
Surface mount components are placed along the front (and often back) faces of the machine. Most components are supplied on paper or plastic tape, in tape reels that are loaded onto feeders mounted to the machine. Larger integrated circuits (ICs) are sometimes supplied arranged in trays which are stacked in a compartment. More commonly used ICs will be provided in tapes rather than trays or sticks. Improvements in feeder technology mean that tape format is becoming the preferred method of presenting parts on an SMT machine.

Early feeder heads were much bulkier, and as a result it was not designed to be the mobile part of the system. Rather, the PCB itself was mounted on a moving platform that aligned the areas of the board to be populated with the feeder head above.

Conveyor belt
Through the middle of the machine there is a conveyor belt, along which blank PCBs travel, and a PCB clamp in the center of the machine. The PCB is clamped, and the nozzles pick up individual components from the feeders/trays, rotate them to the correct orientation and then place them on the appropriate pads on the PCB with high precision. High-end machines can have multiple conveyors to produce multiple same or different kinds of products simultaneously.

Inspection and visual system
Its silhouette is inspected to see if it is damaged or missing (was not picked up), and the inevitable registration errors in pickup are measured and compensated for when the part is placed. For example, if the part was shifted 0.25 mm and rotated 10° when picked up, the pickup head will adjust the placement position to place the part in the correct location.

Some machines have these optical systems on the robot arm and can carry out the optical calculations without losing time, thereby achieving a lower derating factor.
The high-end optical systems mounted on the heads can also be used to capture details of the non-standard type components and save them to a database for future use. In addition to this, advanced software is available for monitoring the production and interconnect database — of the production floor to that of supply chain — in real-time. ASM provides an optional feature for increasing accuracy while placing LED  components on a high end product where in the optical center of the LED is critical rather than the calculated mechanical center based on the component's lead structure. The special camera system measures both physical and optical center and makes the necessary adjustments before placement. It also can acquire the images in either single field of view multiple field of view modes.

A separate camera on the pick-and-place head photographs fiducial marks on the PCB to measure its position on the conveyor belt accurately. Two fiducial marks, measured in two dimensions each, usually placed diagonally, let the PCB's orientation and thermal expansion be measured and compensated for as well. Some machines are also able to measure the PCB shear by measuring a third fiducial mark on the PCB.

Variations
To minimize the distance the pickup gantry must travel, it is common to have multiple nozzles with separate vertical motion on a single gantry. This can pick up multiple parts with one trip to the feeders. Also, advanced software in the newer generation machines allows different robotic heads to work independently of each other to further increase the throughput.

The components may be temporarily adhered to the PCB using the wet solder paste itself, or by using small blobs of a separate adhesive, applied by a glue-dispensing machine that can be incorporated on to the pick and place machine. The glue is added before component placement. It is dispensed by nozzles or by using jet dispensing. Jet dispensing dispenses material by shooting it towards the target, which in this case, is the circuit board.

See also
Component placement
Insertion mount machine

References

Printed circuit board manufacturing